Ewingar State Forest is a plantation forest in northern New South Wales, approximately 36km east of Tenterfield. It encompasses 18,433 hectares of what was formerly Crown land.

New South Wales state forests